Jasvir Singh (born April 13, 1977 in Karnana, India) is a Canadian weightlifter of Indian origin. He qualified for the men's featherweight category at the 2008 Summer Olympics in Beijing, by finishing seventh from the Pan American Weightlifting Championships in Callao, Peru. He is also a five-time Indian and a three-time Canadian champion.

Singh started his sporting career as a sixteen-year-old high school student in the small village of Punjab. In 2002, he came to Vancouver, British Columbia, Canada on a working visa, and also, in hopes for a more promising future and better life. While staying in Canada, Singh was unable to travel to international weightlifting competitions, and barred from participating in prestigious national events. He was discovered by former Olympian and coach Guy Greavette, who perceived him as a powerful athlete and quickly helped him build a sport. Singh made his international debut as part of the Canadian team at the 2003 World Wrestling Championships in Vancouver, and eventually attained numerous successes by winning back-to-back national titles. In 2007, he gained his landed immigrant status, and held a dual citizenship with Canada, making him eligible to compete for the Olympics.

Singh became the first weightlifter from British Columbia to represent Canada at the 2008 Summer Olympics, since his head coach Greavette did so in 1988. In the men's featherweight class, he successfully lifted 115 kg for the single-motion snatch, and hoisted 151 kg more for the two-part, shoulder-to-overhead clean and jerk, to combine a total of 266 kg, finishing in twelfth place.

References

External links
Profile – Canadian Olympic Team
NBC 2008 Olympics profile

Canadian male weightlifters
Canadian people of Indian descent
Canadian people of Punjabi descent
Indian emigrants to Canada
1977 births
Living people
Olympic weightlifters of Canada
Weightlifters at the 2008 Summer Olympics
Sportspeople from Burnaby